The Duchy of Bracciano was a fief of the Papal States, centred on lago di Bracciano and the town of Bracciano itself and ruled by a branch of the Orsini family with the title of Lord (from 1417) and Duke (1560–1696).

History 

The Orsini ruled Bracciano from 1417, when Charles, a descendant of Napoleone Orsini (died c. 1267), was made lord of Bracciano by Pope Martin V. On Charles' death in 1445 the lordship was inherited by Napoleone Orsini (also count of Tagliacozzo), Gentile Virginio, Gian Giordano, Girolamo and Paolo Giordano I Orsini. In 1558 Paolo Giordano I married Cosimo I de' Medici's daughter Isabella de' Medici. To gain the Medici's consent to the match, Pope Pius IV promoted Bracciano to a dukedom and added to its territories, giving the Orsini greater financial resources. The Orsini took full advantage of this, building a new aqueduct and using its water to mine sulphur and iron and manufacture tapestries. After church power had been consolidated, the new duke moved against the barons and gradually placed all the fiefdoms under his complete control.

The classic feudal rights were conferred on the new duke - imposing tribute, minting coins (a right he did not take up), political asylum, the so-called 'mero et mixto imperio' (i.e. exercising judicial power in civil and penal law). The duchy was made up of seven main lands - Bracciano, Anguillara (linked to the Orsini by personal union; technically an autonomous county, than a marquisate, ruled by the duke's eldest son), Cerveteri, Trevignano, Monterano, Campagnano and Formello, as well as twenty-five other estates, such as Palo and Viano.

Vassals of the pope and the king of Spain, the various Orsini branches had accumulated a vast set of lands, reaching from the counties of Tagliacozzo (origin of the Bracciano line), Alba and Carsoli, through the viceregality of Naples and the areas around Subiaco and Lake Bracciano and ending at the Tyrrhenian Sea near castello di Palo, watching over the most important main roads into Rome. Napoleone I Orsini had chosen Bracciano as his capital and turned it into a major military stronghold and an elegant lordly court. The family used Monte Giordano as their palace in Rome and were buried in the collegiate church of Santo Stefano in Bracciano.

After the tragic events surrounding the marriages of Paolo Giordano I, Isabella de' Medici and Vittoria Accoramboni, the most notable duke was his grandson Paolo Giordano II, who became a prince of the Holy Roman Empire (1623) and prince-consort of Piombino through his marriage to the art-lover Isabella Appiani. However, the duchy started to fall into a decline since its ruling family now lived so far away and showed so little interest in it. The final duke, Flavio, was short of money and little by little sold off the duchy's lands to the Chigi and del Grillo families. He finally sold Bracciano itself and the title of duke to the Odescalchi in 1696 - they still own the castle. After his death his widow Marie Anne de La Trémoille moved to Madrid, where Philip IV of Spain made her camarera mayor to queen Maria Luisa of Savoy. However, in 1714, Marie Anne was dismissed by Elisabetta Farnese for her continued interference in Spanish politics and returned to Rome, where she died in 1722. The inalienable lands and ducal rank were thus transferred to the Odescalchi and very briefly to the Torlonia before finally being re-absorbed into the Papal States by Pope Innocent XII.

List of lords and dukes of Bracciano 
Source:

Lords

Dukes

Citations

General sources 
 Bandinelli, Angela Carlino, Bracciano negli occhi della memoria, Mediterranee, Roma, 2004 .
 Carla Michelli Giaccone, Bracciano e il suo castello, Palombi, Roma, 1998 .
 Celletti, Vincenzo, Gli Orsini di Bracciano, Palombi, Roma, 1963 .
 Colonna, Gustavo Brigante, Gli Orsini, Ceschina, Milano, 1955 .
 Sigismondi, Francesca, Lo Stato degli Orsini. Statuti e diritto proprio nel Ducato di Bracciano, Viella, Roma, 2004 .
 Siligato, Anna Cavallaro-Almamaria Mignosi Tantillo-Rosella (a cura di), Bracciano e gli Orsini. Tramonto di un progetto feudale, De Luca, Roma, 1981 .

1560 establishments
1696 disestablishments
Bracciano
History of Lazio
Papal States